Portsmouth South is a constituency represented in the House of Commons of the UK Parliament since 2017 by Stephen Morgan of the Labour Party. Morgan is the first Labour MP to represent the seat.

Boundaries

1918–1950: The County Borough of Portsmouth wards of Havelock, Highland, St Paul, St Simon, and St Thomas.

1950–1955: The County Borough of Portsmouth wards of Havelock, Highland, Kingston, St Paul, St Simon, and St Thomas.

1955–1974: The County Borough of Portsmouth wards of Havelock, Highland, Kingston, St Jude, St Simon, and St Thomas.

1974–1983: The County Borough of Portsmouth wards of Buckland, Fratton, Havelock, Highland, Kingston, St Jude, St Simon, and St Thomas.

1983–2010: The City of Portsmouth wards of Charles Dickens, Fratton, Havelock, Highland, Milton, St Jude, and St Thomas.

2010–present: The City of Portsmouth wards of Central Southsea, Charles Dickens, Eastney and Craneswater, Fratton, Milton, St Jude, and St Thomas.

Constituency profile
The constituency covers the southern part of the city of Portsmouth in Hampshire, including Fratton, the seaside resort of Southsea and HMNB Portsmouth (Portsmouth Naval Dockyard) within the city bounds. The northern part is represented by Portsmouth North.

This constituency is marginally less affluent than its neighbour, with in December 2012 slightly higher unemployment, but considerably below the national average of all constituencies in terms of the claimant count.  Notwithstanding this, following the Second World War the city has a large proportion of flats, increasingly in a more aesthetic apartment style, some being affordable social housing and brutalist tower blocks; however, the majority of the city is of semi-detached and terraced nature with a mixture of incomes centred around the national average and excellent amenities.

History
The constituency was created in 1918 when the larger Portsmouth constituency was split into three divisions: Central, North and South. The Portsmouth Central constituency was abolished in 1950.

During the 2010 general election campaign, independent candidate Les Cummings distributed a leaflet claiming that sitting MP Mike Hancock was a paedophile, which was later proven in court to be false. Cummings was subsequently convicted under the Representation of the People Act 1983 for distributing material which was known to be false with the intention of smearing or defaming to affect the return of a Member of Parliament, and was fined £500 as a result.

Stephen Morgan won the seat at the 2017 general election, the first time ever that the Labour Party have held the seat. Morgan's win was one of 30 net gains made by Labour at that election. At the 2019 general election Labour increased its vote share by  7.6%. This was the second-highest increase in Labour vote share in any seat in the United Kingdom (after Bradford West) in an election where Labour's vote share fell in all but 13 constituencies.

Members of Parliament

Elections

Elections in the 2010s

Elections in the 2000s

Elections in the 1990s

Elections in the 1980s

Elections in the 1970s

Elections in the 1960s

Elections in the 1950s

Elections in the 1940s

Elections in the 1930s

Elections in the 1920s

Elections in the 1910s

See also
 List of parliamentary constituencies in Hampshire

Notes

References

Parliamentary constituencies in Hampshire
Constituencies of the Parliament of the United Kingdom established in 1918
Politics of Portsmouth